Shivani (1923–2003) was a Hindi magazine story writer.

Shivani may also refer to:

People
 Parvati, Hindu goddess, First wife of Shiva
 BK Shivani Verma, Indian spiritual teacher 
 Shivani Bhatnagar, Indian journalist
 Shivani Kapoor, British Asian model
Shivani Surve, Indian television actress in Hindi and Marathi

Places
  Shivani, Tarikere, a village in Tarikere taluk, Chikmagalur district, Karnataka state of India

Films
 Shivani, a 2008 Kannada language film
 Shivani, a 2012 Tamil language film